The Lange Rande is a mountain in the Randen range between the Jura and the Swabian Jura, located between Schleitheim and Hemmental in the Swiss canton of Schaffhausen.

After the Hage, the Lange Rande is the second highest mountain of Schaffhausen.

References

External links
Lange Rande on Hikr

Mountains of the canton of Schaffhausen
Mountains of Switzerland
Mountains of Switzerland under 1000 metres